Diarrhea, also spelled diarrhoea, refers to liquid bowel movements.

Diarrhea types:
Bovine virus diarrhea
Brainerd diarrhea
Infectious diarrhea
Runner's diarrhea
Traveler's diarrhea

Diarrhea also refers to:

Music
 Diarrhea Planet, a rock band
Live Fast, Diarrhea, album by The Vandals
Diarrhea of a Madman, album by Dave Brockie Experience
"Diarrhea", a song by Da Yoopers from their album Yoop It Up

Other
Diarrhea medicine, another name for Milk of Magnesia
Diarrhea (MTV), a character's nickname on Beavis and Butthead

See also
:Category:Diarrhea